Sweden is home to thirteen species of amphibians and six species of reptiles. All nineteen species are protected throughout the country.

Amphibians

Reptiles

References

General references

Sweden
Amphibians
Amphibians
Sweden
Sweden
Sweden